The 1957 Tour de Suisse was the 21st edition of the Tour de Suisse cycle race and was held from 12 June to 20 June 1957. The race started and finished in Zürich. The race was won by Pasquale Fornara.

General classification

References

1957
1957 in Swiss sport
1957 Challenge Desgrange-Colombo